Arhopala paraganesa, the dusky bushblue, is a butterfly in the family Lycaenidae. It was described by Lionel de Nicéville in 1882. It is found in the Indomalayan realm.

Subspecies
A. p. paraganesa (northern India, Nepal, Sikkim)
A. p. zephyretta (Doherty, 1891) (Assam, northern Burma, central Burma, western Thailand)
A. p. mendava Corbet, 1941 (Peninsular Malaysia)
A. p. hammon Fruhstorfer, 1914 (Java)
A. p. dusunensis Barlow, Banks & Holloway, 1971 (Borneo)
A. p. tomokoae (Hayashi, 1976) (Philippines: Palawan)
A. p. felipa Lamas, 2008 (Philippines: Palawan)
A. p. insula Lamas, 2008 (Hainan)

References

External links
Arhopala Boisduval, 1832 at Markku Savela's Lepidoptera and Some Other Life Forms

Arhopala
Butterflies described in 1878
Butterflies of Asia
Taxa named by Lionel de Nicéville